Holiday In Santa Fe, is a 2021 American made-for-television romantic comedy holiday film directed by Jody Margolin Hahn, starring Mario Lopez and Emeraude Toubia. It was originally broadcast on Friday, December 10, 2021.

Plot 
Belinda Sawyer, an executive at one of the largest greeting card and holiday décor chains in Chicago arrives in Santa Fe to seize the opportunity to acquire Casa de Milagro, a family-owned business that makes holiday ornaments and décor inspired by Mexican Christmas traditions. Their award-winning designs, created by matriarch Milagro Ortega, are highly sought-after each holiday season. With help from their father, siblings Tony and Magdalena have run the store in Santa Fe all their lives. But when their beloved Milagro unexpectedly dies, the family struggles to find its heart. As sparks fly between Belinda and Tony, Belinda realizes there is more to Casa de Milagro than meets the eye.

Cast

Production

Development 
This marked Lopez's third project with Lifetime Channel, given the green light following their first two successful outings, Feliz NavivDAD and KFC sponsored short film (branded as a "mini-movie"), A Recipe for Seduction. It was one of four pitches made to the network in 2021.

The film is Emeraude Toubia's first executive producer credit and led to her production company, The Emerald Co., to be signed with United Talent Agency.

Filming 
The movie was filmed entirely in Santa Fe, New Mexico in spring 2021.

Toubia coincidentally shot Holiday in Santa Fe and Amazon Prime Video's holiday series, With Love back to back. Both Christmas-themed projects were released December 2021 with Toubia declared as "The New Queen of Christmas" by Variety Magazine.

References

External links
 

2021 television films
American Christmas films
2010s English-language films
Christmas television films
2021 films
2021 comedy films